Magarnat-e Seh (also Romanized as Magarnāt-e Seh) is a village in Shoaybiyeh-ye Sharqi Rural District, Shadravan District, Shushtar County, Khuzestan Province, Iran. At the 2006 census, its population was 160, in 22 families.

References 

Populated places in Shushtar County